Sir Samuel Davenport   (5 March 1818 – 3 September 1906) was one of the early settlers of Australia and became a landowner and parliamentarian in South Australia.

Davenport was fourth son of George Davenport, a wealthy English banker, and his wife Jane Devereux, née Davies, and was educated at Mill Hill School in North London. Francis and his second wife Sarah Davenport (née Fincher) arrived in Adelaide in February 1840 aboard Rajasthan. After initially considering land near Port Lincoln, he selected land on the upper reaches of the River Angas, including what is now the town of Macclesfield. Francis returned to England in 1841, leaving Henry Giles to manage his affairs.

Davenport married Margaret Fraser Cleland (1821 – 6 February 1902) on 1 June 1842. She would become known for her charitable work, closely associated with Emily Clark, Lady Colton and Catherine Helen Spence.
Samuel, his wife and brother Robert (1816–1896) arrived in Adelaide from Hobart aboard Adelaide in February 1843. 
Francis and Sarah returned to Adelaide aboard Rajusthan in February 1843. He died at the Rundle Street home of William Giles on 8 April 1843.
The remaining brothers lived at Macclesfield and managed the survey. Samuel continued to receive an annual allowance from his father.

Davenport's first ventures in Australia were in mixed farming, almonds and vines, which had sparked his interest when he was in the south of France as a youth. He then tried sheep-farming with approximately 6000 sheep, but disease killed half of them. In 1860 he bought land near Port Augusta, and turned to ranching horses and cattle. He realised from his success that large-stock holdings made healthy profits in South Australia.

From 1849 he lived mostly at his home in Beaumont, in his residence of Beaumont House, which he owned from 1851 onwards. He continued to care for the welfare of tenants at Macclesfield, providing attractive rental terms.

Between 5 May 1846 and 1 July 1848, Davenport was a non-official nominated member of the South Australian Legislative Council.
 
Between 1849 and 1852 he served as a city commissioner. He contested the Legislative Council seat of Hindmarsh without success in a by-election during 1854, but on 25 October 1855 was nominated to the part-elective Legislative Council. He was eventually elected to the first Legislative Council under responsible government in 1857 and administered the oath of allegiance to the councillors on 22 April 1857. He served a number of ministries; however he resigned from the council on 25 September 1866.

Davenport strongly promoted agriculture and other new industries in South Australia. Between 1864 and 1872 he published a number of pamphlets, three of them dealing with the cultivation of olives and manufacture of olive oil, silk and tobacco. Davenport grew both olives and silk on his Beaumont House estate. He was a member of the Royal Agricultural and Horticultural Society and its president from 1873 to 1879 and 1890 to 1891. He was a member of the South Australian Institute's Board of Governors.

He was elected to a number of positions in the agricultural, horticultural and geographical societies, include the American Philosophical Society in 1876. He was also a successful banker like his English father.

Davenport was knighted during 1884 and in 1886 appointed KCMG and given an honorary doctorate by the University of Cambridge. After his death in 1906, obituarists praised his 'honourable record both in public and private life' and both Houses of Parliament were adjourned for his funeral.

The South Australian Assembly seat of Davenport was later named after him.

|-

References

 

Knights Bachelor
Knights Commander of the Order of St Michael and St George
Settlers of South Australia
1818 births
1906 deaths
People educated at Mill Hill School
Members of the South Australian Legislative Council
19th-century Australian politicians